Mauesiini is a tribe of longhorn beetles of the subfamily Lamiinae.

Taxonomy
 Coroicoia
 Mauesia
 Taurolema
 Trichomauesia

References

Lamiinae